Welden is an English language surname, a variant of Weldon. Notable people with the name include:

Ben Welden (1901–1997), American character actor
Louis Welden Hawkins (1849–1910), English symbolist painter
Oliver Welden (1946–2021), Chilean poet
Paula Jean Welden (1928–1946), American college student who disappeared while walking on Vermont's Long Trail hiking route

References

English-language surnames
German-language surnames